The Curtiss CA-1 (sometimes known as the Commuter or the Courtney Amphibian) was an American five-seat biplane amphibian designed by Frank Courtney and built by Curtiss-Wright at St Louis, Missouri.

Design and development
Designed by the British test pilot Frank Courtney, the CA-1 was a five-seat amphibian. The CA-1 was powered by a  Wright 975E-1 radial, cowled and fitted into the leading edge of the top wing driving - through an extension shaft - a pusher propeller. It had a tricycle amphibian landing gear and an enclosed cabin for the pilot and passengers. Only three aircraft were built and they were all sold in Japan, designated Curtiss-Wright LXC (Navy Experimental Type C Amphibious Transport) by the Imperial Japanese Navy Air Service.

Specifications

See also

References

Notes

Bibliography

"Anglo-US Experiment" Flight 14 October 1937
"Latest Curtiss-Wright Amphibian" Flight 9 August 1934. p821

External links

1930s United States civil utility aircraft
CA-1
Flying boats
Amphibious aircraft
Biplanes
Single-engined pusher aircraft
Aircraft first flown in 1935